The 2002 Mnet Music Video Festival (MMF) was the fourth of the annual music awards in Seoul, South Korea that took place on November 29, 2002, at the Little Angels Arts Center.

Leading the nominees was BoA with three nominations. By the end of the ceremony, BoA was the only one to receive multiple awards, which is 2 out of her three nominations.

Background
The award-giving body continued to use the name "M.net Korean Music Festival" (MKMF) for the fourth consecutive year. It was also the fourth time for the event to take place at the Little Angels Arts Center, Seoul, South Korea, while the grand awards (or daesang) were still the Best Popular Music Video and Music Video of the Year. During its fourth year, however, Cha Tae-hyun was not able to host the event; Shin Dong-yup replaced him instead.

The theme for the year's event was "Be the Reds!", which was popularized during the 2002 FIFA World Cup. During the event, the young Yoo Seung-ho presented an award, while Japanese rock singer Hyde was the first Japanese to perform on the ceremony.

Selection process
During the initial screening, the committee selected the 'Best 27' in terms of ranks. Afterwards, both the professional juries and the fans chose their candidates from the nominees. Fans was able to vote online or through a number of downloads from the mobile system. The votes from the fans and the judges were then combined for the winners of each category.

Winners and nominees

Winners are listed first and highlighted in boldface.

{| class="wikitable"
|-
! style="background:#EEDD82; width:50%"| Most Popular Music Video(daesang)
! style="background:#EEDD82; width:50%"| Music Video of the Year(daesang)
|-
| style="vertical-align:top" |
 BoA – "No. 1"
| style="vertical-align:top" |
 Cho PD – "My Style"
|-
! style="background:#EEDD82; width:50%"| Best New Male Artist
! style="background:#EEDD82; width:50%"| Best New Female Artist
|-
| style="vertical-align:top" |
 Rain – "Bad Guy"
 The Name – "The Name"
 RIch (리치) – "Only The Words I Love You" (사랑해 이 말 밖엔)
 Sim Tae-yoon (심태윤) – "Mates" (짝)
 Wheesung – "Can't We" (안되나요)
| style="vertical-align:top" |
Youme (유미) – "Love Is Always Thirsty" (사랑은 언제나 목마르다)
 Rinae (린애) – "Words Without Goodbye" (이별후애)
 Shim Mina – "Answer the Phone" (전화받어)
 Park Kyung-lim – "Illusion" (착각인 늪)
 Ann – "Sick Sick Name" (아프고 아픈 이름)
|-
! style="background:#EEDD82; width:50%"| Best New Group
! style="background:#EEDD82; width:50%"| Best Mixed Group
|-
| style="vertical-align:top" |
 Black Beat – "In The Sky"
 Turtles – "4 Seasons" (사계)
 Milk – "Come To Me"
 Sugar – "Tell Me Why"
 Swi-T – "I'll Be There"
| style="vertical-align:top" |
 The Jadu – "We Need To Talk" (대화가 필요해)
 S#arp – "Kiss Me" (내 입술..따뜻한 커피처럼)
 YTC – "Road" (길)
 Koyote – "Y"
 Cool – "Truth" (쿨진실)
|-
! style="background:#EEDD82; width:50%"| Best Male Group
! style="background:#EEDD82; width:50%"| Best Female Group
|-
| style="vertical-align:top" |
 Shinhwa – "Perfect Man"
 J-Walk – "Suddenly"
 jtL – "A Better Day"
 g.o.d – "Road" (길)
 Click-B – "To Be Continued"
| style="vertical-align:top" |
 S.E.S. – "U"
 Baby Vox – "Coincidence" (우연)
 Chakra – "Come Back" (돌아와)
 Jewelry – "Again"
 Fin.K.L – "Forever" (영원)
|-
! style="background:#EEDD82; width:50%"| Best Male Artist
! style="background:#EEDD82; width:50%"| Best Female Artist
|-
| style="vertical-align:top" |
 Sung Si-kyung – "We Make A Good Pair"
 Kangta – "Memories"
 Moon Hee-joon – "Generous" (아낌없이 주는 나무)
 Shin Seung-hun – "If We Can Part Even Though We Love" (사랑해도 헤어질 수 있다면)
 Lee Seung-hwan – "Mistake" (잘못)
| style="vertical-align:top" |
 Jang Na-ra – "Sweet Dream"
 Kim Hyun-jung – "Knife" (단칼)
 BoA – "No.1"
 Wax – "Please" (부탁해요)
 Lee Soo-young – "La La La"
|-
! style="background:#EEDD82; width:50%"| Best R&B Performance
! style="background:#EEDD82; width:50%"| Best Rock Performance
|-
| style="vertical-align:top" |
 Lena Park – "In Dreams"
 RIch – "I Have A Dream" (사랑해 이말밖엔)
 Hwayobi – "How is it" (어떤가요)
 Fly to the Sky – "My Heart"
 Wheesung – "Can't We"
| style="vertical-align:top" |
 YB – "Love Two"
 Roller Coaster (를러코스터) – "Last Scene"
 Boohwal – "Never Ending Story"
 Jaurim – "That's it" (삔이야)
 Cherry Filter – "Sweet Little Cat" (낭만고양이)
|-
! style="background:#EEDD82; width:50%"| Best Hip Hop Performance
! style="background:#EEDD82; width:50%"| Best Indie Performance
|-
| style="vertical-align:top" |
 Leessang – "Rush" (ft. Jung-in)
 1TYM – "Nasty"
 MC Sniper – "BK Love"
 Cho PD – "My Style"
 Joosuc – "Infinity" (무한대)
| style="vertical-align:top" |
 Trans Fixion – "Come Back to Me"
 3rd Line Butterfly (3호선 버터플라이) – "Photosynthesis" (광합성)
 Lazy Bone – (레이지본) – "Blue water" (큰푸른물)
 Sugar Donut – "Bookshelf lady" (책받침 아가씨)
 Johnny Royal – "Regeneration" (갱생)
|-
! style="background:#EEDD82; width:50%"| Best Dance Performance
! style="background:#EEDD82; width:50%"| Best Ballad Performance
|-
| style="vertical-align:top" |
 BoA – "No. 1"
 Kang Sung-hoon – "My Girl"
 Shinhwa – "Perfect Man"
 Lee Jung-hyun – "Half" (반)
 Harisu – "Liar"
| style="vertical-align:top" |
 Lee Soo-young – "Lalala"
 Kangta – "Memories" (사랑은 기억보다)
 Park Hyo-shin – "Good Person" (좋은사람)
 Sung Si-kyung – "You Touched My Heart" (넌 감동이었어)
 Im Chang-jung – "Sad Monologue" (슬픈혼잣말)
|-
! style="background:#EEDD82; width:50%"| Special Jury Prize
! style="background:#EEDD82; width:50%"| Best International Artist
|-
| style="vertical-align:top" |
 Shin Seung-hun – "If We Can Part Even Though We Love" (사랑해도 헤어질 수 있다면)
Cho PD – "My Style"
Lee Seung-hwan – "Mistake" (잘못)
Jang Na-ra – "Sweet Dream"
Byul – "December 32nd" (12월32일)
g.o.d – "Road" (길)
| style="vertical-align:top" |
 Eminem – "Without Me"
 Blue – "All Rise"
 Britney Spears – "I'm Not a Girl, Not Yet a Woman"
 Christina Aguilera – "Dirrty"
 Linkin Park – "Points of Authority"
 Shakira – "Objection (Tango)"
 Stereophonics – "Have a Nice Day"
|-
! colspan="2" style="background:#EEDD82; width:50%" |Best Music Video Director
|-
| colspan="2" |
 Cha Eun-taek (차은택)
 Go Young-jun (고영준)
 Seo Hyeon-seung
 Hong Jong-ho
|}

Special awards
 Mobile Popularity Award: Jang Na-ra – "Sweet Dream" Netizen Popularity Award: Moon Hee-joon – "Generous" (아낌없이 주는 나무) Music Video Pioneer Award: Lee Seung-hwan'''

Multiple awards

Artist(s) with multiple wins
The following artist(s) received two or more wins (excluding the special awards):

Artist(s) with multiple nominations
The following artist(s) received two or more nominations:

Performers and presenters
The following individuals and groups, listed in order of appearance, presented awards or performed musical numbers.

Performers

Presenters

References

External links
 Mnet Asian Music Awards  official website

MAMA Awards ceremonies
Mnet Music Video Festival
Mnet Music Video Festival
Mnet Music Video Festival
Mnet Music Video Festival, 2002